Brian MacMahon (1923–2007) is a British-american epidemiologist.

Brian MacMahon may also refer to:
Brian MacMahon of Macmahon Holdings
Col. Brian MacMahon in Confederate Ireland
Bryan MacMahon (judge) (born 1941), Irish judge
Bryan MacMahon (writer) (1909–1998), Irish writer
Brian MacMahon (runner) (active 2012), Irish runner

See also
Brian McMahon (disambiguation)